Mitcham railway station was a railway station in Mitcham in the London Borough of Merton, England. It closed after the last train ran on 31 May 1997. Mitcham tram stop replaced the station, and is located just east of the original site.

History 
After the Surrey Iron Railway (SIR) went out of business in 1846, the Wimbledon and Croydon Railway (W&CR) took over the route and opened the station on 22 October 1855. The route was then operated as a conventional railway, until it was closed by Railtrack after the last train on 31 May 1997, for conversion to tram operation. Station Court, on the north of the tram line and east of London Road A217 was originally used as a merchant's home.

References 

Disused railway stations in the London Borough of Merton
Former London, Brighton and South Coast Railway stations
Railway stations in Great Britain opened in 1855
Railway stations in Great Britain closed in 1997